Zengami is a video game development company, currently known for making the game TurtlePop: Journey to Freedom on the Nintendo Switch.

History 
Zengami was founded by Andrew Carter, the former executive producer at Atari Melbourne with Holger Liebnitz and Graeme Scott, the Art and Technical Directors respectively.

References

External links

Music and Sound Effects 
The original music soundtrack for Turtlepop: Journey to Freedom was composed by Simon Betts, who also sourced and created all of the sound effects.

Video game companies